Jacobus Van Wagenen Stone House is a historic home located at Rochester in Ulster County, New York.  It is a traditional -story stone, gable-roofed house built about 1751.

It was listed on the National Register of Historic Places in 1999.

References

Houses on the National Register of Historic Places in New York (state)
Houses completed in 1751
Houses in Ulster County, New York
National Register of Historic Places in Ulster County, New York
1751 establishments in the Thirteen Colonies